The Lincolns are a Canadian rhythm and blues band, fronted by Prakash John and based in Toronto, Ontario. The band performs music in the style of the 1960s and 1970s.

History 

In 1979, after leaving the Alice Cooper tours, Prakash John returned to Toronto and founded an R&B band, The Lincolns.  He recruited musicians from previous tours.  The Lincolns performed locally in Toronto and also toured around Ontario. In August, 1987 they appeared in the CBC television special  "Live at the Astrolabe,".

The band has released two albums, Take One on Attic Records and the independently released Funky Funky Funky, originally commissioned by the CBC.

With various personnel changes, the Lincolns continue to play around Canada, performing R&B music in the style of the 1960s and 70s. In 2016 the band performed as part of the musical production Simply the Best.

References

External links
  The Lincolns official website

Musical groups established in 1979
Musical groups from Toronto
Canadian rhythm and blues music groups
Attic Records (Canada) artists
1979 establishments in Ontario